Lufthansa Flight 540 was a scheduled commercial flight for Lufthansa, serving the  Frankfurt–Nairobi–Johannesburg route.

On 20 November 1974, the Boeing 747-130 that was operating as Flight 540 was carrying 157 people (140 passengers and 17 crew members) crashed and caught fire shortly after taking off from Jomo Kenyatta International Airport in Nairobi for the last leg of the flight, resulting in the deaths of 55 passengers and 4 crew members. This was the first fatal accident involving a Boeing 747.

Aircraft and crew

Aircraft

The aircraft involved was a Boeing 747-130 registered as D-ABYB and was named Hessen. It was the second 747 to be delivered to Lufthansa. It made its first flight on 30 March 1970 and was delivered to Lufthansa on 13 April the same year. The aircraft was powered by four Pratt and Whitney JT9D-7 turbofan engines. The aircraft had 16,781 flying hours at the time of the accident.

Crew
The flight crew consisted of 53-year-old captain Christian Krack (who had more than 10,000 flight hours, with 1,619 hours on the Boeing 747), 35-year-old first officer Hans-Joachim Schacke (3,418 flight hours, with more than 2,000 hours on the Boeing 747) and 51-year-old flight engineer Rudolf (Rudi) Hahn (13,000 hours of flying experience).

Accident
As the aircraft was making its takeoff from runway 24 at the Jomo Kenyatta International Airport in Nairobi, the pilots felt a buffeting vibration. The captain continued the climb and retracted the landing gear. However, as this was being done, the aircraft started to descend and the stall warning system light came on. It then struck an elevated access road and broke up. The left wing exploded and fire spread to the fuselage. 55 of the 140 passengers and 4 of the 17 crew members died.

Cause
The cause of the crash was determined to be a stall caused by the leading edge slats (strictly speaking, outboard variable camber leading-edge slats and inboard Krueger flaps) having been left in the retracted position. Even though the trailing edge flaps were deployed, without the slats being extended the aircraft's stall speed was higher and the maximum angle of attack was lower. As a result, the aircraft was unable to climb out of ground effect. The flight engineer was found to have failed to open the slat system bleed air valves as required on the pre-flight checklist. This prevented bleed air from flowing to the 747's pneumatic slat system and, since the leading edge slats on the 747 are pneumatically driven, kept it from deploying the leading edge slats for takeoff. The takeoff warning system, which would have sounded an alarm if the flaps had not been set for takeoff, did not have a separate warning that the slats' pneumatic valve had not been opened by the flight engineer.

The faulty state of the slats should by design have been indicated by yellow warning lights: one for the pilot, and eight for the flight engineer. However, both crew members stated in court that these lights had been green. Three possible explanations have since been offered for this inconsistency: that the morning sun was blinding the cockpit crew and thus hampered color perception, that a construction error could have caused green lights despite the retracted slats, and that the crew lied. None of these possibilities could be conclusively proven. The flight crew was blamed for not performing a satisfactory pre-takeoff checklist, but the accident report also faulted the lack of adequate warning systems that could have alerted the crew to the problem. Two previous occurrences of this error had been reported, but in those cases the pilots had been able to recover the aircraft in time. After this third, deadly incident, Boeing added systems to warn pilots if the slat valve had not been opened prior to takeoff.

Captain Krack and flight engineer Hahn were dismissed from Lufthansa shortly after, but their dismissals were overturned by a labor court, as there was no investigation report available to rule out the chances of a technical defect.

Flight engineer Hahn was charged with criminal negligence, but was acquitted in 1981. This marks the first crashed Boeing 747.

See also

 List of aircraft accidents and incidents resulting in at least 50 fatalities

Bibliography

The final report is this work:
 "Report on Accident to Boeing 747 Registered D-ABYB which occurred on 20th November 1974 at Nairobi Airport, Kenya." East African Community Accident Investigation Branch (Nairobi), 1976. Worldcat entry.

References

External links

 

Cockpit Voice Recorder transcript and accident summary

Airliner accidents and incidents caused by pilot error
Airliner accidents and incidents caused by design or manufacturing errors
Aviation accidents and incidents in 1974
Aviation accidents and incidents in Kenya
540
Accidents and incidents involving the Boeing 747
1974 in Kenya
November 1974 events in Africa
Germany–Kenya relations